The  is an annual auto show held in January at the Makuhari Messe, Chiba City, Japan for Performance and custom aftermarket parts and technology displays. Hosted by the Nippon Auto Parts Aftermarket Committee (NAPAC), the Tokyo Auto Salon is one of the top motor shows globally for modified and tuned cars. The 2019 Tokyo Auto Salon featured 906 vehicles, 426 exhibitors, and 4,175 booths that offered aftermarket accessories for purchase. There are also after-market parts manufacturers, custom shops, care manufacturers, automotive businesses, and automotive vocational schools. There are not only custom cars and after-market manufacturers, there is also live entertainment. Top musicians from around the world and talk shows hosting famous drivers and celebrities can be seen at the Tokyo Auto Salon.

One of the more popular forms of entertainment are the “booth babes” who are popular among the spectators and photographers alike. “Booth babes” tend to have a following of fans from various other auto shows throughout the year.

The Tokyo Auto Salon started in 1983. The exhibition takes place every year in January. On the opening Friday, entry to the exhibition is permitted from 9am to 7pm. On Saturday, the show is open to the public from 9am to 7pm, and on Sunday from 9am to 6pm.  The main organizer for the Tokyo Auto Salon is the Tokyo Auto Salon Association (TASA). The main promoter of the Tokyo Auto Salon is Tokyo Auto Salon Committee. The affiliate co-promoter is NAPAC. The Chiba Prefecture government, Chiba City government, Avex Entertainment Inc., San-Eisyobo Publishing Co., Ltd., Idea Inc., and the Option-Land Global Communications Association are all affiliate sponsors and supporting organizations.

Venue 
The Tokyo Auto Salon takes place at Makuhari Messe. The Tokyo Auto Salon’s popularity has grown resulting in an increases from 8 halls to 11 halls at the Makuhari Messe. In addition to Tokyo Auto Salon occupying 11 of the International Exhibition Halls, it also takes place in the Makuhari Event Hall and International Conference Hall. The event also extends outside the event center into the Outdoor Arena and road of the neighboring Zozo Marine Stadium. The 2012 Auto Salon required a space of 54,000 m2, while the 2013 Auto salon increased to a space of 72,000 m2 (Wijayasinha, 2013). Makuhari Messe is one of the leading comprehensive convention facilities in Japan. It is a full-scale convention complex with three large-scale facilities, which are the International Exhibition Hall, International Conference Hall, and Makuhari Event Hall. It also contains a parking lot that can facilitate 6,000 vehicles. There are also six international hotels located within walking distance from the convention center. The convention center host tradeshows, exhibitions, international conferences, ceremonies, parties, symposiums, concerts, sports events, and fashion shows all year round.

In 2012, the Tokyo Auto Salon held a show in Thailand. This marked the first year the Tokyo Auto Salon granted a license to a Thai enterprise to host the Auto Show under its brand. This was also the first automotive performance and custom parts show held in Thailand. The show featured more than 30 award-winning concept cars imported from Japan, as well as other premium and eco friendly vehicles. The following year, the “Tokyo Auto Salon Singapore 2013” was held at the Marina Bay Sands resort, supported by the Tokyo Auto Salon Association (TASA) of Japan, MediaCorp, and Muse Group. The purpose of the Singaporean version of the exhibition is to create a healthy culture for cars that promotes legal modifications. Organizers of the Singapore show hope to hold future shows that show modifications that would be legal for car enthusiasts.

Introductions

2013
At the 2013 Tokyo Auto Salon, car manufactures introduced new concept features to older models. Nissan introduced modified versions of their 2012 line of Juke, Note, Fairlady Z, and GT-R models. The new modifications kept with the “green” trend in vehicle features, which included increased engine output and improved aerodynamics. Nissan’s highlight debut for the 2013 Tokyo Auto Salon, was the unveiling of the NV350 Caravan Rider Transporter. The caravan was specifically made for the Tokyo Auto Salon and is a cross between a commercial can and a leisure cruising vehicle. Nissan also showed up to the Auto Salon with race cars like the Motul Autech GT-R. Honda, a Japanese motor company, showed up to the Tokyo Auto Salon with a series of 10 vehicles in the N-One mini family.  Models included the N-One Modulo style, Mugen Racing N-One Concept, and an N-One model created by the Japan Nailist Association.  Honda also brought with them an “exhibition model” S2000 Modulo.  This model reflects an old roadster. This is the first time this model has been seen since it left production in 2009.  A design study is being presented on Honda’s CR-V as well as the CR-Z Mugen RZ. The later of which will only produce 300 units.

2015
The 2015 Tokyo Auto Salon saw manufacturers such as Toyota showcase a range of modified vehicles, from a Land Cruiser with 46-inch tyres to a Gazoo Racing GT86.

2023
Production cars:
 Renault Mégane RS Trophy Limited Edition

Concept cars:
 Subaru Crosstrek Boost Gear
 Subaru Rex Boost Gear

Response 
2019 Tokyo Auto Salon experienced record high attendance with 330,666 visitors attending over the three day event. This increasing number of attendees was matched with a greater number of cars displayed in the 2019 event. The increasing popularity of the Tokyo Auto Salon has gained the attention of both international vendors as well as the media. Media coverage of the event has been picked up by several well-known magazine and media channels commonly mentioning their favorite cars and concepts from the event. In the 2019 event 1,886 of the visitors attended as media personal. This led to a wide coverage of the different concepts and cars that were displayed and debuted at the show. Media outlets that provided coverage on the event include: Motor Trend, Car and Driver, Jalopnik, and several other media outlets.

External links

Official Tokyo Auto Salon website
Nippon Auto Parts Aftermarket Committee (NAPAC)
Makuhari Messe information

References

Auto shows in Japan
Winter events in Japan
Recurring events established in 1983
1983 establishments in Japan